The medial rectus muscle is a muscle in the orbit near the eye. It is one of the extraocular muscles. It originates from the common tendinous ring, and inserts into the anteromedial surface of the eye. It is supplied by the inferior division of the oculomotor nerve (III). It rotates the eye medially (adduction).

Structure 
The medial rectus muscle shares an origin with several other extrinsic eye muscles, the common tendinous ring. It inserts into the anteromedial surface of the eye. This insertion has a width of around 11 mm.

Nerve supply 
The medial rectus muscle is supplied by the inferior division of the oculomotor nerve (III). A branch of it enters the muscle around two fifths along its length. It usually divides into 2 smaller branches, occasionally 3. These further subdivide, becoming smaller down the length of the muscle until they become imperceptible to standard staining around 17 mm from the insertion of the muscle.

Relations 
The insertion of the medial rectus muscle is around 7.5 mm from the insertion of the superior rectus muscle, and around 6 mm from the inferior rectus muscle. It is shorter but stronger than the other orbital recti muscles. It rarely changes position significantly when it contracts, unlike the other extraocular muscles.

Function 
The medial rectus muscle rotates the eye medially (adduction). It works using a pulley system as it curves around the anterior surface of the eye.

Clinical significance

Strabismus 
Strabismus (lazy eye) may be caused by a medial rectus muscle that is located too high in the orbit of the skull.

Esotropia (convergent strabismus) may also be caused by sixth nerve palsy, which causes weakness or paralysis of the lateral rectus muscle. Sometimes, botulinum toxin may be injected into the medial rectus muscle. Whilst this reduces the ability to abduct and adduct the eye for tracking, it corrects the esotropia and so generally improves vision.

Compression 
The medial rectus muscle lies directly adjacent to the orbit of the skull. This leaves it vulnerable to being compressed (incarcerated) during skull fractures, which can prevent movement of the eye. This usually resolves when skull fractures are fixed.

Surgical damage 
The medial rectus muscle may be damaged during eye surgery or skull surgery, such as functional endoscopic sinus surgery. The damage can be minor, such as bruising, or severe, such as cutting through the muscle partially or completely, and nerve injury.

Additional images

See also 

 Extraocular muscles

References

External links 
 
 
 Diagram at howstuffworks.com

Muscles of the head and neck
Human eye anatomy

de:Augenmuskeln#Musculus rectus medialis